Jonah Anthony Bolden (born 2 January 1996) is an Australian-American former professional basketball player. He started his professional career with FMP in Serbia, where he was named the ABA League Top Prospect in 2017. He played a season-and-a-half with the Philadelphia 76ers before joining the Phoenix Suns.

Bolden is the son of an American former pro basketball player Bruce Bolden, and moved to the United States as a senior in high school. A highly ranked college recruit, he played college basketball for the UCLA Bruins. Bolden was ineligible to play with the Bruins in his freshman year in 2014–15 after the National Collegiate Athletic Association (NCAA) ruled him a partial-qualifier due to his transferring as a high school senior. After playing with UCLA as a sophomore, Bolden left the school and played one season with FMP. He was selected by Philadelphia in the second round of the 2017 NBA draft with the 36th overall pick, but played one season with Maccabi Tel Aviv in Israel before joining the 76ers. He also played for the Australia national under-19 basketball team in the 2013 FIBA Under-19 World Championship.

Early life
Bolden was born in Melbourne to an American father Bruce Bolden and Egyptian mother Marie Therese Yacoub. He has a younger sister Cairo Bolden. His mother is an author, screenwriter and producer. His father played professional basketball, including 17 years in the National Basketball League in Australia. Jonah grew up in Sydney and began playing basketball for the Bankstown Bruins at five years of age. As a teenager, he attended Homebush Boys High School and was first selected to represent his home state of New South Wales at the 2013 Basketball Australia Under 18 National Championships. Bolden led the NSW Metro state team to the national final by averaging 18 ppg and 13 rpg throughout the competition and his outstanding performance in the national championships saw him selected as the youngest player to represent Australia at the 2013 FIBA Under-19 World Championship. In August 2013, he relocated to the United States to play as a senior at Findlay College Prep, a private preparatory school in Henderson, Nevada, near Las Vegas. However, his high school eligibility expired after his first semester and he transferred midseason to Brewster Academy in New Hampshire.

In December 2013, Bolden chose to play college basketball at UCLA over Louisville, Kentucky, Indiana, USC, and SMU. A consensus four-star recruit, he was listed as the No. 25 player in his class by Scout.com, No. 32 by Rivals.com, and No. 69 by ESPN.com, while also being ranked as the No. 5 power forward by Scout.com.

College career
Bolden was a redshirt in his freshman year at UCLA after he was ruled ineligible to play in 2014–15. Before the season, the NCAA declared him a partial-qualifier, stemming from his transfer from Australia when his senior year in high school has already began. In January 2015, he was cleared by the NCAA to practice with the Bruins. In May, he underwent arthroscopic surgery for a torn meniscus in his right knee that was expected to sideline him for six to eight weeks.

A  guard capable of playing either forward position, Bolden entered 2015–16 as the Bruins' projected replacement for wing player Norman Powell and combo forward Kevon Looney, who both moved on to the National Basketball Association (NBA). However, his college debut was delayed after he violated unspecified team rules and was held out of UCLA's season opener, an 84–81 upset loss to Monmouth. He made his first appearance the following game, making an impact on defense while scoring 11 points and adding five rebounds in an 88–83 win over Cal Poly. On 12 December, Bolden played 30 minutes and had 10 points and 11 rebounds for his first career double-double in a 71–66 road win over No. 20 Gonzaga. UCLA coach Steve Alford inserted him into the game to guard a hot Kyle Wiltjer, who finished with 20 points but shot only 4 of 12 for the remainder of the game. Tony Parker had the initial defensive assignment, but Bolden provided more athleticism and mobility. In the following game against Louisiana-Lafayette, Bolden made his first career start when center Thomas Welsh was out sick, and the Bruins won 89–80. While he emerged as UCLA's top player off the bench, Bolden's impact on offense was minimal.

After UCLA struggled on defense while starting 3–5 in their Pac-12 Conference schedule, Alford believed their front court was "slow" and moved Bolden into the starting lineup at power forward in place of Parker against Washington State. Bolden scored only three points, but his defense helped the team win 83–50 for their largest margin of victory of the season. On 14 February 2016, he led the team with a career-high 16 points to go with nine rebounds in a 78–65 win over Arizona State. The Bruins lost their final five games of the season to finish with a 15–17 record. Bolden made 11 starts, and averaged 4.6 points and 4.8 rebounds in 21.7 minutes in 31 games. He ranked third on the team with 27 blocks.

Bolden felt that he was underutilized during his first season. During the offseason, he hoped to move to small forward, the position he was recruited to play, but he remained in a big man role, even with reserve György Golomán healthy again. Possessing potential talent to play in the National Basketball Association (NBA), Bolden decided to forego his remaining two years of college eligibility and play professionally, despite having already missed out on declaring for the 2016 NBA draft.

Professional career

FMP (2016–2017)
Bolden signed with FMP of the ABA League and the Basketball League of Serbia, where he played both forward positions. On 15 March 2017, Bolden was awarded the ABA League Top Prospect title after averaging 12.9 points and 7.2 rebounds per game in his rookie season. He also averaged 4.2 three-point field goal attempts per game, making 41.9 percent, and added one steal and one block per game.

Maccabi Tel Aviv (2017–2018)
On 10 June 2017, Bolden signed a two-year contract with Crvena zvezda. Twelve days later, Bolden was selected with the 36th pick of the 2017 NBA draft by the Philadelphia 76ers. In July 2017, he joined the 76ers for the 2017 NBA Summer League.

Before even suiting up for a single regular season game for the Crvena zvezda, on 21 July 2017, Bolden signed a three-year contract with the Israeli club Maccabi Tel Aviv. On 12 December 2017, Bolden recorded a season-high 23 points, shooting 8-of-14 from the field, along with 10 rebounds, 3 assists and 3 steals in a 98–90 win over Ironi Nahariya. Bolden went on to win the 2017 Israeli League Cup and the 2018 Israeli League Championship titles with Maccabi.

Philadelphia 76ers (2018–2020)
On 25 July 2018, Bolden signed with the Philadelphia 76ers. On 16 October 2018, he made his NBA debut playing in a single minute under a 107–85 loss to the Boston Celtics. During his rookie season, Bolden has had multiple assignments to the Delaware Blue Coats, the 76ers' NBA G League affiliate.

Bolden was waived on 7 February 2020.

Phoenix Suns (2020)
On 12 February 2020, Bolden was signed to a 10-day contract by the Phoenix Suns, who were without big men Frank Kaminsky, Aron Baynes, Dario Šarić, and Deandre Ayton during that time. In his debut that day, he had six points, seven rebounds and a plus-minus of +17 in 26 minutes in a 112–106 win over the Golden State Warriors. Bolden played in two more games for the Suns, which saw all of their big men (minus Kaminsky) return to action before he wasn't signed for a second 10-day contract on February 24.

National team career
Bolden played for the Australia national under-19 team at the 2013 FIBA Under-19 World Championship in the Czech Republic at the age of 17. He played in eight of the nine games that Australia competed in, averaging 2.6 points and 2.9 rebounds while playing 10.1 minutes per game. His top performance was a nine-point game against Senegal. Bolden made his senior debut for the Australian Boomers in an exhibition match against Canada in August 2019.

Career statistics

Professional

NBA

Regular season

|-
| style="text-align:left;"| 
| style="text-align:left;"| Philadelphia
| 44 || 10 || 14.5 || .494 || .354 || .481 || 3.8 || .9 || .4 || .9 || 4.7
|-
| style="text-align:left;" rowspan="2"| 
| style="text-align:left;"| Philadelphia
| 4 || 0 || 3.5 || .667 || .000 || .000 || .3 || .0 || .3 || .0 || 1.0
|-
| style="text-align:left;"| Phoenix
| 3 || 0 || 11.0 || .250 || .000 || 1.000 || 2.7 || .0 || .7 || .7 || 2.0
|- class="sortbottom"
| style="text-align:center;" colspan="2"| Career
| 51 || 10 || 13.5 || .486 || .340 || .484 || 3.4 || .8 || .4 || .8 || 4.3

Playoffs

|-
| style="text-align:left;"| 2019
| style="text-align:left;"| Philadelphia
| 10 || 0 || 7.9 || .263|| .250 || .500 || 1.4 || .3|| .2 || .1 || 1.6
|- class="sortbottom"
| style="text-align:center;" colspan="2"| Career
| 10 || 0 || 7.9 || .263|| .250 || .500 || 1.4 || .3|| .2 || .1 || 1.6

EuroLeague

|-
| style="text-align:left;"| 2017–18
| style="text-align:left;"| Maccabi Tel Aviv
| 29 || 28 || 21.1 || .487 || .319 || .512 || 5.5 || 1.6 || 1.2 || .9 || 6.9 || 10.4
|- class="sortbottom"
| style="text-align:center;" colspan=2| Career
| 29 || 28 || 21.1 || .487 || .319 || .512 || 5.5 || 1.6 || 1.2 || .9 || 6.9 || 10.4

College

|-
| style="text-align:left;"| 2015–16
| style="text-align:left;"| UCLA
| 31 || 11 || 21.7 || .415 || .250 || .733 || 4.8 || 1.1 || .7|| .9 || 4.6

See also
 List of foreign basketball players in Serbia
 List of NBA drafted players from Serbia

References

External links

 UCLA Bruins bio
 EuroLeague profile
 FIBA profile
 

1996 births
Living people
ABA League players
Australian expatriate basketball people in Israel
Australian expatriate basketball people in Serbia
Australian expatriate basketball people in the United States
Australian men's basketball players
Australian people of African-American descent
Australian people of Egyptian descent
Basketball League of Serbia players
Basketball players from Melbourne
Brewster Academy alumni
Delaware Blue Coats players
Findlay Prep alumni
KK FMP players
Maccabi Tel Aviv B.C. players
National Basketball Association players from Australia
Philadelphia 76ers draft picks
Philadelphia 76ers players
Phoenix Suns players
Power forwards (basketball)
UCLA Bruins men's basketball players